17 Girls is a 2011 French comedy-drama film about 17 teenage girls who make a pregnancy pact. The film was screened at the 2011 Montreal World Film Festival and the 2011 Cannes Film Festival. 17 Girls is based on the alleged pregnancy pact that took place at Gloucester High School in Massachusetts in 2008.

The 2010 American film The Pregnancy Pact is based on the same story.

Plot
In Lorient, 17 teenage girls from the same high school make an unexpected decision, incomprehensible to the boys and adults. They decide to get pregnant at the same time. Camille (Louise Grinberg) lives alone with her mother who is overwhelmed by her work. She becomes pregnant after a condom problem with a sexual partner who is not her boyfriend. She is the first to discover a positive pregnancy test.

She wants to keep her child, which will convince the others to become pregnant and they can all raise their children together.  These girls do not want to comply with the traditional code of conduct and just want to "give the love they have to a baby." Emancipation, is the keyword of these girls who build a plan to no longer be reflections of their parents. "We will be only 16 years apart from our kids, this is ideal. We will be closer in age, no clash of generations!" They decide to educate their future children together in the form of a "hippie community."

In the end, Camille loses her baby after a minor traffic accident. She and her mother leave town without telling anyone where they've gone. The other girls have their babies, but they do not form a "community."

Cast
 Louise Grinberg : Camille
 Esther Garrel : Flavie
 Roxane Duran : Florence
 Solène Rigot : Mathilde
 Juliette Darche : Julia
  : Clementine
 Florence Thomassin : Camille's mother
 Noémie Lvovsky : high school nurse
  : the headmaster
 Frédéric Noaille : Florian
 Arthur Verret : Tom
  : Clementine's mother
 Serge Moati : TV journalist

Reception
Premiere magazine likened 17 Girls to The Virgin Suicides by Sofia Coppola saying "same languid pop, same delicately grainy picture, same kind of heterogeneous female cast, same absence of boys, reduced to the roles of stooges".

Awards and nominations
Nominated for the Camera d'Or at the 2011 Cannes Film Festival
Won the Michel d'Ornano Award at the Deauville American Film Festival
Nominated for the 2012 César Award for Best First Feature Film

References

External links

2011 films
2010s French-language films
French pregnancy films
Teenage pregnancy in film
Films directed by Delphine and Muriel Coulin
2010s pregnancy films